Naantali is a town in southwestern Finland, and, as a resort town during the summer, an important tourist centre of the country. The municipality has a population of 

Most of this area is located on the islands, but the majority of the population lives on the mainland. Most of the islands are covered with forest and farmland, while the mainland consists chiefly of residential areas.

History 
One of the oldest towns in Finland, Naantali was founded around the medieval Brigittine convent Vallis gratiae (or Nådendal Abbey), the church of which still dominates its skyline. The charter was signed by King Christopher of Sweden, the then ruler of Finland, in 1443. The convent got trading rights and other privileges, and the town around it began to grow. It also became an important destination for pilgrimage.

In the 16th century, as Catholicism gave way to Protestantism as the official religion of Finland, the convent was closed, and the town plunged into a depression. This lasted until the mid-18th century, when the town got a tollgate and a customs chamber. In the two centuries of economic stagnation before that the town had become famous for its knitted stockings, a craft carried on from the times of the convent.

The year 1863 saw the founding of the spa at Cape Kalevanniemi, which raised the town's status as a holiday venue. In 1922, the Kultaranta estate on Luonnonmaa was made the official summer residence for the President of the Republic, after Finland had gained its independence five years earlier.

The municipalities of Merimasku, Rymättylä and Velkua were consolidated with Naantali on January 1, 2009.

The per capita tax income of the town is the second highest of all towns in Finland, and the highest in the province of Southwest Finland.

Name
The name Naantali is the fennicised version of the Swedish name of the town, . The Swedish name was given as a direct translation from the Latin Vallis Gratiae which literally means "The Valley of Grace".

Tourism and points of interest 
The proximity of both Turku, the region's administrative centre and largest city, and of the archipelago both contribute to the area's popularity with tourists.

Other points of interest in the city include Moomin World, a theme park on the island of Kailo, and Naantali’s medieval convent stone church. The area also includes the official summer residence of the President of Finland, the Kultaranta estate which is located on Luonnonmaa.

The archipelago sea boat traffic is handled by S/S Ukkopekka. Old steamship cruise Naantali-Turku-Naantali.

Naantali hosts an international music festival every June, and the traditional Sleepyhead Day carnival in July.

Culture 
Every July 27, Naantali celebrates the National Sleepy Head Day. The old tradition is to throw a chosen "sleepy head", an usually Finnish celebrity, in the sea from the city's port at 7 a.m. The identity of the sleeper is kept secret until the event. People who are chosen have usually done something to the benefit of the city.

Other industries 
In addition to tourism, the city's main industries are electricity production, oil refining, manufacturing, and services. The Port of Naantali is the third largest in Finland in terms of goods traffic, and the city is home to a power plant and an oil refinery owned by the government-controlled company Fortum and Neste.

International relations

Twin towns — Sister cities
Naantali is twinned with:

  Vadstena, Sweden  
  Nordfyn, Denmark  
  Svelvik, Norway
  Vesturbyggð, Iceland  
  Puck, Poland  
  Kirovsk, Russia

Notable people 
 Kaarlo Heinonen (1878–1944)
 Teppo Rastio (born 1934)
 Pekka Siitoin (1944–2003)
 Keijo Virtanen (born 1945)
 Ilkka Kantola (born 1957)
 Lauri Heikkilä (born 1957)
 Jukka Vilander (born 1962)
 Cristal Snow (born 1975)

Gallery

See also 
 Ekenäs, Finland

References

External links 

Town of Naantali – Official website
Naantali Tourist Information Ltd

Naantali Spa Hotel
Moomin World
VG-62

 
Cities and towns in Finland
Populated coastal places in Finland
Seaside resorts in Finland
Medieval Finnish towns
Grand Duchy of Finland
Populated places established in the 1440s
Port cities and towns of the Baltic Sea